Shreegopal Vyas (born 15 February 1932) is an Indian politician of the Bharatiya Janata Party and a member of the Parliament of India representing Chhattisgarh in the Rajya Sabha, the upper house of the Parliament. He is an alumnus of the Jabalpur Engineering College. He retired from the Rajya Sabha on 13 February 2019. Shreegopal Vyas has been Rajyasabha MP from Chhattisgarh state from 3rd April 2006 to 02nd April 2012.

References

Bharatiya Janata Party politicians from Chhattisgarh
Living people
1932 births
Rajya Sabha members from Chhattisgarh